Manuel Noguera Earnshaw (November 19, 1862 – February 13, 1936) was a Resident Commissioner of the Philippines from 1913 to 1917.

Early life and education
He was born in Cavite, in then Captaincy General of the Philippines, on November 19, 1862. He attended the Ateneo Municipal de Manila and Escuela Nautica de Manila.

Early career
He became engaged in engineering and in the drydocking business in 1884. He was the founder, president, and general manager of the Earnshaw Slipways & Engineering Co.

Resident Commissioner
He was elected, as an Independent candidate, as Resident Commissioner from the Philippines and served from March 4, 1913, to March 3, 1917. He was not a candidate for renomination in 1916. He discontinued his former business pursuits in 1921 and lived in retirement in Cavite.

Death
He died in Manila, in then Commonwealth of the Philippines, February 13, 1936, and was buried in Manila North Cemetery.  M. Earnshaw Street in Sampaloc, Manila, is named for him, whereas T. Earnshaw Street in Tondo is named for his brother Tomás Earnshaw, a Manila mayor.

The remains of Manuel Earnshaw have been transferred to San Agustin Church in Manila.

See also
List of Asian Americans and Pacific Islands Americans in the United States Congress

External links
 

1862 births
1936 deaths
Burials at San Agustin Church (Manila)
Filipino people of American descent
Resident Commissioners of the Philippines
Members of the United States Congress of Filipino descent
People from Cavite
Filipino people of British descent

Ateneo de Manila University alumni